Ivodea is a genus of flowering plants belonging to the family Rutaceae.

Its native range is Comoros, Madagascar.

Species:

Ivodea acuminata 
Ivodea alata 
Ivodea analalavensis 
Ivodea ankeranensis 
Ivodea antilahimenae 
Ivodea aymoniniana 
Ivodea capuronii 
Ivodea choungiensis 
Ivodea confertifolia 
Ivodea cordata 
Ivodea cristata 
Ivodea decaryana 
Ivodea delphinensis 
Ivodea lanceolata 
Ivodea macrocarpa 
Ivodea mahaboensis 
Ivodea mahanarica 
Ivodea mananarensis 
Ivodea mayottensis 
Ivodea menabeensis 
Ivodea moheliensis 
Ivodea nana 
Ivodea occidentalis 
Ivodea petrae 
Ivodea ravelonarivoi 
Ivodea razakamalalae 
Ivodea reticulata 
Ivodea sahafariensis 
Ivodea toliarensis 
Ivodea trichocarpa

References

Zanthoxyloideae
Zanthoxyloideae genera
Taxa named by René Paul Raymond Capuron